Alida Neave is a former South African tennis player.

Neave reached the doubles final at the 1929 French Championships with compatriot Bobbie Heine Miller but were defeated in the final by Lili de Alvarez and Kea Bouman in two straight sets. In 1937, she made the singles final of the South African Championships but lost in three sets to Bobbie Heine Miller.

Grand Slam finals

Doubles

Runners-up (1)

References

South African female tennis players
Year of birth missing
Year of death missing